Oreamuno may refer to:

Alberto Oreamuno Flores (1905–1980), Costa Rican political figure
Eusebio Figueroa Oreamuno (1827–1883), Costa Rican politician
Joaquín de Oreamuno y Muñoz de la Trinidad (1755–1827), Costa Rican who led a coup in 1823
Manuel de Jesús Jiménez Oreamuno (1854–1916), Costa Rican politician
Próspero Fernández Oreamuno, President of Costa Rica from 1882 to 1885
Ricardo Jiménez Oreamuno served as president of Costa Rica on three occasions

See also
Oreamuno Canton, the name of the seventh canton in the province of Cartago in Costa Rica